Tomb WV24 is an ancient Egyptian tomb located in the western arm of the Valley of the Kings. It was  reported by Robert Hay and John Wilkinson in the 1820s and visited by Howard Carter; however, it was not fully explored until Otto Schaden's excavations in 1991.

Location, layout, and contents
WV24 dates to the Eighteenth Dynasty and consists of a well-cut vertical shaft that opens, via a large doorway, to a single unfinished chamber. Given its close association with WV25, Richard H. Wilkinson and Schaden suggest it may have been intended for a high ranking noble, or perhaps it was meant to be a storage chamber for overflow from the royal burial, as seen with WV23 and WVA. The amount of work done of the cutting of both this tomb and WV25 suggest the tombs were commenced and abandoned at the same time.

The tomb does not appear to have received an Eighteenth Dynasty burial. However, it was later used in the Third Intermediate Period for the burial of at least five individuals, including a baby.

References

Reeves, N & Wilkinson, R.H. The Complete Valley of the Kings, 1996, Thames and Hudson, London.
Siliotti, A. Guide to the Valley of the Kings and to the Theban Necropolises and Temples, 1996, A.A. Gaddis, Cairo.

External links

Theban Mapping Project:WV24 - Includes detailed maps of most of the tombs.

WV24